Devanshi (Hindi : देवांशी) is a Hindu/Sanskrit Indian feminine given name, which means "one who is endowed with all the beauty, serenity, and love of God".

Hindu given names
Indian feminine given names
Telugu names
Telugu given names